"I'm Gonna Find A Cave" is a song written in 1965 by Jimmy Radcliffe and Buddy Scott.

First recorded in 1966 by soul singer Charlie Starr on a United Artist Records single followed in the same year by an early psychobilly version by Billy Lee Riley on Crescendo Records Single. 
Other versions of the song in this year were recorded in England where singer, songwriter, and record producer Miki Dallon released his Mod version on his own Strike Records. Dallon was so enthusiastic about the song over the course of the year he produced a version with the popular British freakbeat group The Sorrows and noted London R&B act Jimmy Powell And The Dimensions.
Uruguayan garage rock quintet Los Bulldogs recorded "I'm Gonna Find A Cave" with "Winchester Cathedral" in English on their 1966 RCA Victor Single (later also appeared in their second LP). However, it wasn't until 1968 When The Banana Splits Recorded "I'm Gonna Find A Cave", featuring the lead vocal of singer Ricky Lancelotti, and four other Jimmy Radcliffe songs ("Adam Had'em", "The Show Must Go On", "Don't Go Away Go-Go Girl" and "Soul") for the television show The Banana Splits Adventure Hour that it became an early Saturday morning household tune. The song "Don't Go Away Go-Go-Girl" was also recorded by indie pop band The Mr. T Experience.
In 1988 Tacoma Washington Punk band Girl Trouble recorded their version of the song, as "Gonna Find A Cave", for the highly influential Sub Pop 200 a compilation released in the early days of the Seattle grunge scene. It features songs (many of them first releases and otherwise unattainable) from Tad, The Fluid, Nirvana, Steven Jesse Bernstein, Mudhoney, The Walkabouts, Terry Lee Hale, Soundgarden, Green River, Fastbacks, Blood Circus, Swallow, Chemistry Set, Girl Trouble, The Nights and Days, Cat Butt, Beat Happening, Screaming Trees, Steve Fisk, and The Thrown Ups.
In February 2011 a campaign to make "Gonna Find A Cave" the international "Man Cave" anthem was started by Jimmy Radcliffe's son.  Retro rockers Spider 45, in a tribute to the recently deceased Bingo of the Banana Splits, released their version in October 2017.

Selected discography
 Charlie Starr United Artist Single #50029, Produced by Garry Ganahan, Arranged By Herb Bernstein, 1966
 Billy Lee Riley Crescendo Single #371, 1966
 Miki Dallon Strike Single #306, (Spain) Picture Sleeve RCA Single#3-10163 1966
 Los Bulldogs (Uruguay) RCA Single, 1966
 Banana Splits We're The Banana Splits LP, Decca DL-75075, 1968
 Girl Trouble Sub Pop 200, 3 LP Sub Pop Records - #SP25 Boxed Set, 1988 
 Jet Weston's Combo A Go Go, Cavestomp Records, 2001

Selected CD & Digital Release Discography
 Jimmy Powell & The Dimensions "R&B Sensation" CD See For Miles Records, 1993
 The Sorrows "Take A Heart" CD Castle Records, 2000
 Jimmy Powell & The 5 Dimensions "Sugar Babe" CD Castle Records, 2003
 Miki Dallon "That's Alright" CD Castle Records, 2003
 Miki Dallon "Complete Works 1963-1966" CD One Media Publishing, 2007 
 Jimmy Powell & The Dimensions "Progressive Talking Blues" Digital One Media Publishing, 2007
 The Sorrows "You Got What I Want The Essential Sorrows - 1965-67" CD Grapfuit Records, 2010

COMPILATIONS:
 Sub Pop 200 (V.A. Comp) Re-Issue CD Sub Pop Records #SP25-2, (Girl Trouble - "Gonna Find A Cave"), 1995
 Little Steven's Garage Rock Invasion (V.A. Comp) CD Cavestomp Records (Jet Weston's Combo A Go-Go "Gonna Find A Cave"), 2001
 Doin’ The Mod Vol. 4 (V.A. Comp) CD Castle Records (The Sorrows - "Gonna Find A Cave"), 2002
 That Driving Beat Vol. 3 UK Freakbeats (V.A. Comp) CD Past & Present Records, (Miki Dallon - Gonna Find A Cave"), 2003
 Soul Masters – The Dancer (V.A Comp) Digital Corinco AG Records (Miki Dallon & The Medallions "Gonna Find A Cave), 2005
 Rare Mod Vol.2 (V.A. Comp)  (CD & Digital & Vinyl) Acid Jazz Records (C-Jam Blues "Gonna Find A Cave"), 2009

References
* Martin Charles Strong, The Great Indie Discography (Canongate U.S., 2003), [1].

1965 songs